Dundurn is the site of a Pictish hillfort in what is now Strathearn in Perth and Kinross, Scotland.

The fort was situated on a hill with the River Earn to one side and the Allt Ghoinean burn to another. Excavations have identified three stages of fortification between 500 and 800AD.

The fort at Dundurn (or Dún Duirn) is mentioned twice in the Annals of Ulster, firstly relating to a siege in 683AD, at which time it was held by King Bridei III, and secondly as the location of the death of a King Giric (King Gregory) in 889AD.

It is a designated scheduled monument.

References 

Archaeological sites in Perth and Kinross
Hill forts in Scotland
Celtic archaeological sites
Picts
Scheduled Ancient Monuments in Perth and Kinross